Imām Ṣāhib (Pashto/) is a town in the Kunduz Province of Afghanistan, center of the Imam Sahib District. It is sometimes called Khwaja or Hazrat. Baba Hatim Ziyarat is located on the outside of Imam Sahib. The port of Shir Khan Bandar is located to the west of the town.

Climate
With an influence from the local steppe climate, Imam Sahib features a cold semi-arid climate (BSk) under the Köppen climate classification. The average annual temperature in Imam Sahib is 17.1 °C, while the annual precipitation averages 307 mm.

July is the hottest month of the year with an average temperature of 30.2 °C. The coldest month January has an average temperature of 3.4 °C.

See also
 Kunduz Province

References 

Populated places in Kunduz Province